Naomi Ackie (born 22 August 1991) is an English actress. She made her television debut as Jen in the Doctor Who episode "Face the Raven" (2015). For her role as Bonnie on the television dark comedy-drama series The End of the F***ing World, she received the British Academy Television Award for Best Supporting Actress in 2020. Ackie is well known for her role as Jannah in the film Star Wars: The Rise of Skywalker (2019). In 2021, she had a main role on the third season of Master of None. In 2022, she garnered critical acclaim for her portrayal of American pop icon, singer Whitney Houston in the biopic Whitney Houston: I Wanna Dance with Somebody, earning a Rising Star nomination at the British Academy Film Awards.

Early life 
Naomi Ackie was born in Camden and raised in Walthamstow, London, the daughter of second-generation immigrants from Grenada. Her father was a Transport for London employee and her mother worked for the National Health Service. She is one of three children and has an older brother and sister. She went to Walthamstow School for Girls.

Her first role was at the age of 11, playing the angel Gabriel in a school nativity play. She studied at the Royal Central School of Speech and Drama and graduated in 2014.

Career
Ackie's breakthrough film role was in Lady Macbeth (2016), for which she won the British Independent Film Award for Most Promising Newcomer in 2017. She subsequently appeared in Idris Elba's directorial debut Yardie (2018) and Star Wars: The Rise of Skywalker (2019). She also portrayed Bonnie in the second season of Netflix's black comedy series The End of the F***ing World, and  a school inspector in Education, an hour-long drama part of Steve McQueen's anthology film series Small Axe.

Ackie portrayed American singer Whitney Houston in the biographical film Whitney Houston: I Wanna Dance with Somebody. The film opened to mixed reviews but widespread praise for Ackie's performance.

Upcoming projects 
Ackie is committed to star in Zoë Kravitz's directorial debut Pussy Island, co-starring Channing Tatum, and in Bong Joon-ho's Mickey 17, based on Edward Ashton's science-fiction novel, alongside Robert Pattinson, Toni Collette and Mark Ruffalo.

Filmography

Film

Television

Stage

Video game

Awards and nominations

References

External links 
 

1991 births
Living people
Black British actresses
21st-century British actresses
British actresses
English people of Grenadian descent
Best Supporting Actress BAFTA Award (television) winners
People from Walthamstow
Year of birth uncertain
Actresses from London
Alumni of the Royal Central School of Speech and Drama